Pythia scarabaeus is a species of air-breathing saltmarsh snail, a pulmonate gastropod mollusk in the family Ellobiidae.

Appearance
This salt marsh snail is light brown all over with dark brown to black spots distributed irregularly. variations include a lighter background color.

Locality
Pythia scarabaeus is found in the Indo-Pacific range.

References

 Smith B.J. (1992). Non-marine Mollusca. In: Houston W.W.K. (ed.) Zoological Catalogue of Australia, volume 8. xii + 405 pp. 
 Groh K. (2010). [in G. Poppe, ed.] Philippine marine mollusks, vol. 3: 446-457. Hackenheim: Conchbooks.

External links

Ellobiidae
Gastropods described in 1758
Taxa named by Carl Linnaeus